Austrotoma  aguayoi is a species of sea snail, a marine gastropod mollusk in an unassigned family within the superfamily Conoidea

It has an average shell size of 20–40 mm. Its habitat ranges from East Brazil to Southern Argentina.

References

  Forcelli, D.O., 2000. Moluscos Magallanicos. Guia de Moluscos [marinos] de Patagonia y Sur de Chile.

External links
 Biolib.cz : image

aguayoi
Gastropods described in 1953